Marti Jane Anderson is a New Zealand marine biology and statistics academic. She is currently a distinguished professor at the Massey University.

Academic career

After a 1996 PhD titled  'Tests of ecological hypotheses in intertidal estuarine assemblages'  at the University of Sydney, she moved to the Massey University, rising to professor.

In 2013 she was made Fellow of the Royal Society of New Zealand.

Selected works 
 Anderson, Marti J. "A new method for non‐parametric multivariate analysis of variance." Austral ecology 26, no. 1 (2001): 32–46.
 Anderson, Marti, Ray N. Gorley, and Robert K. Clarke. Permanova+ for Primer: Guide to Software and Statisticl Methods. Primer-E Limited, 2008.
 McArdle, Brian H., and Marti J. Anderson. "Fitting multivariate models to community data: a comment on distance‐based redundancy analysis." Ecology 82, no. 1 (2001): 290–297.
 Anderson, Marti J., and Trevor J. Willis. "Canonical analysis of principal coordinates: a useful method of constrained ordination for ecology." Ecology 84, no. 2 (2003): 511–525.
 Legendre, Pierre, and Marti J. Anderson. "Distance‐based redundancy analysis: testing multispecies responses in multifactorial ecological experiments." Ecological monographs 69, no. 1 (1999): 1-24.

References

External links
 Anderson on Introductions Necessary
 

Living people
Year of birth missing (living people)
New Zealand women academics
New Zealand marine biologists
University of Sydney alumni
New Zealand statisticians
Academic staff of the Massey University
Fellows of the Royal Society of New Zealand
21st-century New Zealand women writers